Business simulation may refer to

Business simulation game - a computer game genre.
Training simulation
Simulations and games in economics education
Business simulation
Business game